The Planter's Wife is a 1908 American silent short drama film directed by D. W. Griffith.  It is adaptation of the 1880s play of the same name by James K. Tillotson.

Cast
 Arthur V. Johnson as John Holland
 Claire McDowell as Mrs. John Holland
 Harry Solter as Tom Roland
 Florence Lawrence as Tomboy Nellie
 George Gebhardt as Boatman
 Linda Arvidson
 Charles Inslee

References

External links
 

1908 films
1908 drama films
Silent American drama films
American silent short films
American black-and-white films
Films directed by D. W. Griffith
1908 short films
1900s American films